The 1948 North Carolina lieutenant gubernatorial election was held on November 2, 1948. Democratic nominee Hoyt Patrick Taylor defeated Republican nominee R. Kyle Hayes with 72.18% of the vote.

Primary elections
Primary elections were held on May 29, 1948.

Democratic primary

Candidates
Hoyt Patrick Taylor, former State Senator
Daniel L. Tompkins, unsuccessful candidate for nomination for Lieutenant Governor in 1940

Results

General election

Candidates
Major party candidates
R. Kyle Hayes, Republican
Hoyt P. Taylor, Democratic

Other candidates
A. Kenneth Harris, Progressive

Results

Bibliography

References

1948
Gubernatorial
North Carolina